Heavy Metal Music is the only studio album by American heavy metal band Newsted. It was released on August 6, 2013, and is the first Newsted release to feature guitarist Mike Mushok who joined the band following their debut release EP, Metal (2013). The album is the band's only full-length release, since bassist Jason Newsted shut down the project in early 2014.

Background
The band finished pre-production of the album in March 2013, and finished recording sessions in April. The album title, track listing and artwork were unveiled on June 4, 2013, along with the album's first track, "Heroic Dose".  The album features two songs, "Soldierhead" and "King of the Underdogs", from their debut EP, Metal. On July 18, 2013, Newsted premiered a second track, "Ampossible". On July 25, 2013, Newsted released an official lyric video for the song "Above All".

Track listing
All songs written by Jason Newsted

 Both deluxe editions come with a 38-minute documentary on the making of the album.

Personnel
Newsted
 Jason Newsted − lead vocals, bass
 Jessie Farnsworth − rhythm & lead guitar, backing vocals
 Mike Mushok − lead guitar
 Jesus Mendez Jr. − drums, percussion

References

2013 debut albums
Newsted albums
Self-released albums